Bir Bol, officially the Political Party of State Unity and Patriotism "Bir Bol", was a liberal political party in Kyrgyzstan. It was led by Altynbek Sulaymanov. The party had been described having 'low visibility'. The party entered parliament for the first time with in 2015, following the 2015 Kyrgyz parliamentary election in which it garnered 8.52% of the vote (12 seats). It lost all its 12 seats in the 2020 Kyrgyz parliamentary election, which was subsequently annulled. The party participated in the 2021 elections as part of the Alliance party.

History

The party was founded on 28 June 2010 as the Liberal Democratic Party "Bir Bol". The party opposed the government of Kyrgyz President Sooronbay Jeenbekov.

References

Political parties in Kyrgyzstan
2014 establishments in Kyrgyzstan
Political parties established in 2014
Political parties disestablished in 2021